The City of Bendigo was a local government area covering the central area and inner western suburbs of the regional city of Bendigo, Victoria, Australia.

History

The City of Bendigo was first incorporated as the Sandhurst Municipality on 24 April 1855. It became a borough on 11 September 1863, and a city on 21 July 1871. It was renamed as the City of Bendigo on 8 May 1891.

On 7 April 1994, the City of Bendigo was abolished, and along with the Borough of Eaglehawk, the Rural City of Marong and the Shires of Huntly and Strathfieldsaye, was merged into the newly created City of Greater Bendigo.

Wards

The City of Bendigo was divided into three wards, each of which elected three councillors:
 Barkly Ward
 Darling Ward
 Sutton Ward

Suburbs
 Bendigo*
 Golden Square
 Ironbark
 Long Gully
 North Bendigo
 Quarry Hill
 West Bendigo
 White Hills

* Council seat.

Population

* Estimate in the 1958 Victorian Year Book.

References

External links
 Victorian Places - Bendigo

4. In Zadie Smith's Swing Time, the character Aimee is originally from Bendigo.

Bendigo